Morada (Spanish for "Residence") is a census-designated place (CDP) in San Joaquin County, California, United States. The population was 3,166 at the 2020 census, down from 3,828 at the 2010 census.

Geography
Morada is located at  (38.039971, -121.249389).

Demographics

2010
The 2010 United States Census reported that Morada had a population of 3,828. The racial makeup of Morada was 2,848 (74.4%) White, 47 (1.2%) African American, 28 (0.7%) Native American, 412 (10.8%) Asian, 30 (0.8%) Pacific Islander, 263 (6.9%) from other races, and 200 (5.2%) from two or more races. Hispanic or Latino of any race were 676 persons (17.7%).

The Census reported that 3,810 people (99.5% of the population) lived in households, 0 (0%) lived in non-institutionalized group quarters, and 18 (0.5%) were institutionalized.

There were 1,425 households, out of which 410 (28.8%) had children under the age of 18 living in them, 934 (65.5%) were opposite-sex married couples living together, 120 (8.4%) had a female householder with no husband present, 61 (4.3%) had a male householder with no wife present.  There were 53 (3.7%) unmarried opposite-sex partnerships, and 8 (0.6%) same-sex married couples or partnerships. 265 households (18.6%) were made up of individuals, and 166 (11.6%) had someone living alone who was 65 years of age or older. The average household size was 2.67.  There were 1,115 families (78.2% of all households); the average family size was 3.03.

The population was spread out, with 809 people (21.1%) under the age of 18, 259 people (6.8%) aged 18 to 24, 644 people (16.8%) aged 25 to 44, 1,315 people (34.4%) aged 45 to 64, and 801 people (20.9%) who were 65 years of age or older.  The median age was 48.4 years. For every 100 females, there were 101.4 males.  For every 100 females age 18 and over, there were 99.1 males.

The homeowner vacancy rate was 2.3%; the rental vacancy rate was 8.2%.  3,390 people (88.6% of the population) lived in owner-occupied housing units and 420 people (11.0%) lived in rental housing units.

2000
As of the census of 2000, there were 3,726 people, 1,356 households, and 1,084 families residing in the CDP. The racial makeup of the CDP was 81.86% White, 6.52% Asian, 0.70% African American, 0.67% Native American, 0.46% Pacific Islander, 6.17% from other races, and 3.62% from two or more races. Hispanic or Latino of any race were 13.12% of the population.

There were 1,356 households, out of which 29.6% had children under the age of 18 living with them, 69.9% were married couples living together, 7.2% had a female householder with no husband present, and 20.0% were non-families. 17.3% of all households were made up of individuals, and 9.4% had someone living alone who was 65 years of age or older.  The average household size was 2.70 and the average family size was 3.04.

In the CDP, the population was spread out, with 23.9% under the age of 18, 6.3% from 18 to 24, 20.7% from 25 to 44, 31.2% from 45 to 64, and 17.9% who were 65 years of age or older.  The median age was 44 years. For every 100 females, there were 102.0 males.  For every 100 females age 18 and over, there were 97.4 males.

The median income for a household in the CDP was $72,241, and the median income for a family was $86,240. Males had a median income of $63,750 versus $34,861 for females. The per capita income for the CDP was $34,939.  About 5.5% of families and 7.7% of the population were below the poverty line, including 8.6% of those under age 18 and 4.0% of those age 65 or over.

References

Census-designated places in San Joaquin County, California
Census-designated places in California